Emerald is an unincorporated community in Yakima County, Washington, United States, approximately  west of Sunnyside.

References

Northern Pacific Railway
Unincorporated communities in Yakima County, Washington
Unincorporated communities in Washington (state)